2021 in Korea may refer to:
2021 in North Korea
2021 in South Korea